Ballymore Lough is a freshwater lake in County Mayo, Ireland. It is overlooked by the ancient Kildermot Abbey.

References

Lakes of County Mayo